Seán Meehan (born 1999) is an Irish Gaelic footballer who plays for Cork Senior Championship club Kiskeam and at inter-county level with the Cork senior football team. He usually lines out as a centre-back.

Career statistics

Honours

Mary Immaculate College
Trench Cup (1): 2018

Cork
National Football League Division 3 (1): 2020
All-Ireland Under-20 Football Championship (1): 2019
Munster Under-20 Football Championship (1): 2019

References

1999 births
Living people
Kiskeam Gaelic footballers
Cork inter-county Gaelic footballers